Béla Kovács (born 25 February 1960) is a Hungarian politician and Member of the European Parliament (MEP) from Hungary between 2010 and 2019. He is a former member of Jobbik, which he left in 2016.

He was elected President of the Alliance of European National Movements (AENM) on 17 December 2013, replacing Bruno Gollnisch.

The Hungarian government accused Kovács of engaging in espionage against European Union institutions for the Russian government. In September 2014, the Hungarian public prosecutor asked the European Parliament to suspend Kovács's MEP immunity so that he could be investigated. The European Parliament lifted the immunity on 14 October 2015.

In September 2022 the Curia of Hungary sentenced him in absentia to five years imprisonment for espionage. He lives and teaches in Russia.

Béla Kovács's Russian father served in the military and his son has been 'known to the KGB almost from the day he was born'.

References

External links
Béla Kovács Bio on jobbik.hu 
jobbik-mep-bela-kovacs-accused-spying-previously-lose-immunity

1960 births
Living people
Politicians from Budapest
Jobbik MEPs
MEPs for Hungary 2009–2014
MEPs for Hungary 2014–2019